Vanity is a 2015 French / Swiss drama film directed by Lionel Baier.

The film stars Patrick Lapp as David Miller, a man in his 70s who checks into a fleabag motel with the intention of committing assisted suicide. He discusses his motivations with Esperanza (Carmen Maura), the administrator of the clinic who is assigned to assist in his death, but the situation is complicated when the legal requirement for a second witness brings Treplev (Ivan Georgiev), a Russian rent boy who is servicing clients in the next room and who awakens David's own repressed homosexuality, into the situation.

The film premiered in the ACID program at the 2015 Cannes Film Festival, where it was a nominee for the Queer Palm.

Cast 
 Patrick Lapp - David Miller
 Carmen Maura - Esperanza
 Ivan Georgiev - Treplev
 Adrien Barazzone

References

External links 

2015 drama films
2015 films
2015 LGBT-related films
French drama films
French LGBT-related films
Swiss drama films
Swiss LGBT-related films
Gay-related films
LGBT-related drama films
2010s French-language films
French-language Swiss films
2010s French films